Klein Associates Inc. is the company founded by Gary A. Klein to apply his research on decision-making in naturalistic settings. On September 2, 2005, Klein Associates was acquired by Applied Research Associates, a New Mexico-based firm that develops engineering solutions for private and public sector clients. Klein remains associated with the firm as Chief Scientist.

Consulting in naturalistic decision making
Klein associates is known for developing and applying its own approach to cognitive task analysis. Its approach is informed by the recognition primed decision model. This view of decision making in the real-world has led to developing models of several aspects of human cognition including: Problem Detection, Mental Simulation, Advanced Team Decision Making, and Dynamic Replanning.

Klein Associates is a participant in Team ISX to develop a knowledge engineering system for Vulcan Ventures-funded Project Halo.

Controversy
The Naturalistic Decision Making approach championed by Gary Klein and Klein Associates challenges the views of decision making taken by Nobelist Daniel Kahneman, with other experts, like Roy Beach taking positions straddling Klein's and Kahneman's.

See also
Decision making

References

External links
 Official company web site
 ASK Talks with Dr. Gary Klein. NASA ASK Issue 20 undated
 Seeing through Expert Eyes: Ace decision makers may perceive distinctive worlds Science News Vol. 154, No. 3, July 18, 1998, p. 44
 APA Monitor Decision researchers split, but prolific Vol. 30, No. 5, May 1999
 What's Your Intuition ? Fast Company August, 2000
 Bruce Bower, Reworking Intuition: Business simulations spark rapid workplace renovations Science Week Oct. 23, 2004; Vol. 166, No. 17 , p. 263
 the deciding factor Daniel D. Frey and Kemper Lewis Design engineers make decisions for a living: Research looks for ways to make the process go smoother. Mechanical Engineering Design March 2005
 Brown, Paul B. What's Offline: Analyzing Failure Beforehand New York Times September 22, 2007

Publications
 

Management consulting firms of the United States